Culina may refer to:

Architecture
The kitchen in an ancient Roman house, or domus

Companies
Culina Group, UK logistics company

Languages
Culina language (disambiguation), several languages
Kulina language, an Arauan language of Brazil and Peru spoken by about 4,000 people

People
Čulina, Croatian surname
Branko Culina (born 1957), football coach and former player
Jason Culina (born 1980), football player
Kulina people, an indigenous people of Brazil and Peru

See also 
Kulina (disambiguation)